Alejandro Vigil González (born 11 February 1993) is a Spanish male volleyball player. He is part of the Spain men's national volleyball team. On club level he plays for Noliko Maaseik.

References

External links
Alejandro Vigil at the International Volleyball Federation
 

1993 births
Living people
Spanish men's volleyball players
Sportspeople from Asturias
People from Siero
Spanish expatriates in Belgium
Spanish expatriate sportspeople in Italy
Expatriate volleyball players in Belgium
Expatriate volleyball players in Italy
Competitors at the 2018 Mediterranean Games
Mediterranean Games silver medalists for Spain
Mediterranean Games medalists in volleyball